The 2001 Georgetown Tigers football team was an American football team that represented Georgetown College of Georgetown, Kentucky, as a member of the Mid-South Conference (MSC) during the 2001 NAIA football season. In their sixth season under head coach Bill Cronin, the Tigers compiled a perfect 14–0 record (7–0 against conference opponents) and won the NAIA national championship, defeating , 49–27, in the NAIA National Championship Game.

The 2001 season was Georgetown's second consecutive undefeated season and NAIA national championship. The team was led on offense by senior quarterback Eddie Eviston.

Schedule

References

Georgetown Tigers
Georgetown Tigers football seasons
NAIA Football National Champions
Georgetown Tigers football
College football undefeated seasons